Xenicotela is a genus of longhorn beetles of the subfamily Lamiinae, the sole member of the tribe Xenicotelini containing the following species:

 Xenicotela bimaculata (Pic, 1925)
 Xenicotela distincta (Gahan, 1888)
 Xenicotela pardalina (Bates, 1884)

References

Lamiinae